Pribinić noble family, also Radosalić noble family, Radosalić–Pribinić noble family, were a prominent medieval Bosnian noble family, a holder of the hereditary honor, which ruled over the medieval župa of Lepenica, a part of the medieval Bosnian state. Župa Lepenica was located in central Bosnia and included modern day's towns of Kiseljak, Fojnica and Kreševo. The Lepenica was mentioned for the first time in 1244 in the charter of the Hungarian king Bela IV, along with other parishes that existed in the area of central Bosnia.

Known members of this family and their genealogy can be established by their appearance in Bosnian medieval state charters. Only seven members of this family are known. All of them were members of the stanak, that is, the assembly of nobility and the state council and close associates of the ruler.

They are recorded on the ruling charters of the kings Tvrtko I, Dabiša, Ostoja and Tvrtko II.

On the stećak, designated by the commission to preserve monuments of Bosnia and Herzegovina as No. 2, in the protected necropolis in Zabrđe, there is well-preserved relief of the coat of arms, along with an inscription, an epitaph to the Bosnian Grand Knyaz, Radoje Radosalić Pribinić.

Inscription is written in Bosnian Cyrillic and reads:

According to the inscription, the stećak was laid down and inscribed by his son, Prince and Knyaz Radič.

 Brajko, was župan  from the first generation of Pribinić and appears in 6 charters between 1353 and 1392;
 Vukota, knyaz, appears in 3 charters between 1367 and 1395;
 Vukac Vukotić, grandson of Vukota, who appears in charters from 1419 and 1426;
 Radosav, župan, koji se pojavljuje u dvije povelje iz 1378. i 1392. godine). 
 Radoje Radosalić, son of Radosav,  župan, and later Grand Knyaz of Bosnia, appearing on 6 charters in the period from 1392 to 1408; 
 Radič Radojević, son of Radoj, prince and knyaz, signatory on charters from 1417 and 1420 (died between 1420 and 1426); 
 Dragić Radičević, son of Radič, the last known member of this family, who appears on the charter of King Tvrtko II dated 7 October 1426.

Bibliography 

 Pavao Anđelić, Srednji vijek - doba stare bosanske države. In: Visoko i okolina kroz historiju 1, SO Visoko, Visoko, 1984, pp. 102–297
 Marko Vego, Zbornik srednjovjekovnih natpisa Bosne i Hercegovine. IV, Zemaljski muzej u Sarajevu, Sarajevo, 1970.
 Pavao Anđelić, Arheološka ispitivanja. In: Lepenica priroda, stanovništvo, privreda i zdravlje. Naučno društvo Bosne i Hercegovine, posebna izdanja, knjiga III, Sarajevo, 1963, pp. 151–191

References 

Bosnian noble families